Aaron Green (born October 15, 1992) is a former American football running back. He was signed by the Los Angeles Rams as an undrafted free agent in 2016. He played college football at TCU.

Early years
Green attended James Madison High School. He accepted a football scholarship from University of Nebraska. He transferred to TCU after his freshman season. He sat out the 2012 season to comply with the NCAA transfer rules.

He became a starter as a junior, leading the team with 922 rushing yards and 9 touchdowns on a 7.1 per carry average. As senior, he appeared in 13 games (10 starts), finishing seventh in school history with 1,272 rushing yards on the season.

Professional career

Los Angeles Rams
Green was signed as an undrafted free agent by the Los Angeles Rams after the 2016 NFL Draft on May 4. On September 3, 2016, he was released by the Rams during final team cuts and was signed to the practice squad the next day. He was promoted to the active roster on December 23, 2016.

On September 2, 2017, Green was waived by the Rams.

Dallas Cowboys
On November 27, 2017, Green was signed to the Dallas Cowboys' practice squad. He was released on December 18, 2017.

Buffalo Bills
On January 2, 2018, Green was signed to the Buffalo Bills' practice squad. He signed a reserve/future contract with the Bills on January 8, 2018. He was waived/injured by the Bills on May 14, 2018 and placed on injured reserve. He was released with an injury settlement on May 22, 2018.

San Antonio Commanders
On August 26, 2018, Green signed with the San Antonio Commanders of the Alliance of American Football. He was a backup behind Kenneth Farrow until the league folded in April 2019.

References

External links
 TCU Horned Frogs bio

Living people
1992 births
Players of American football from San Antonio
African-American players of American football
American football running backs
Nebraska Cornhuskers football players
TCU Horned Frogs football players
Los Angeles Rams players
Dallas Cowboys players
Buffalo Bills players
San Antonio Commanders players
21st-century African-American sportspeople